Daniella Dragojevic (born 23 March 1989) is a Danish handball player who plays for Ringkøbing Håndbold.

References
 

1989 births
Living people
Handball players from Copenhagen
Danish female handball players